John Dalby (1810–1865) was an English 19th-century painter of horses and hunting scenes.

Dalby lived in York and signed his paintings "Dalby York" so that he is sometimes known as Dalby of York.  His father, David Dalby (1794-1836), painted landscapes and animals.

References

External links
 : paintings from Racing at Hoylake to The End of the Day

1810 births
1865 deaths
19th-century English painters
English male painters
Equine artists
19th-century English male artists